King Shark may refer to:

 King Shark is a fictional supervillain appearing in comic books published by DC Comics
 "King Shark" (The Flash episode), an episode of The Flash

The Flash (2014 TV series) redirects